Kalaeloa Airport , also called John Rodgers Field (the original name of Honolulu International Airport) and formerly Naval Air Station Barbers Point, is a joint civil-military regional airport of the State of Hawaii established on July 1, 1999, to replace the Ford Island NALF facilities which closed on June 30 of the same year. Located on the site of the developing unincorporated town of Kalaeloa and nestled between the Honolulu communities of Ewa Beach, Kapolei and Campbell Industrial Park in West Oahu, most flights to Kalaeloa Airport originate from commuter airports on the other Hawaiian islands.  While Kalaeloa Airport is primarily a commuter facility used by unscheduled air taxis,  general aviation and transient and locally based military aircraft, the airport saw first-ever scheduled airline service begin on July 1, 2014, with Mokulele Airlines operating flights to Kahului Airport on Maui.

It is included in the Federal Aviation Administration (FAA) National Plan of Integrated Airport Systems for 2017–2021, in which it is categorized as a regional reliever facility.

On July 2, 2021, Transair Flight 810, a Boeing 737-200 jet aircraft,  considered the possibility of landing at the airport before successfully ditching to an ocean area near it. The two occupants, (the pilot and co-pilot) survived the incident.

Authority
Kalaeloa Airport is part of a centralized state structure governing all of the airports and seaports of Hawaii.  The official authority of Kalaeloa Airport is the Governor of Hawaii.  He or she appoints the Director of the Hawaii State Department of Transportation who has jurisdiction over the Hawaii Airports Administrator.

The Hawaii Airports Administrator oversees six governing bodies: Airports Operations Office, Airports Planning Office, Engineering Branch, Information Technology Office, Staff Services Office, Visitor Information Program Office.  Collectively, the six bodies have authority over the four airport districts in Hawaii: Hawaii District, Kauai District, Maui District and the principal Oahu District.  Kalaeloa Airport is a subordinate of the Oahu District officials.

Airlines and destinations
Mokulele Airlines became the first airline to provide scheduled service at Kalaeloa when it began flights to Kahului Airport on Maui on July 1, 2014. After serving the airport for over two years and finding itself unable to make a profit doing so, the airline ended scheduled service at the airport in September 2016.

Military usage

NAS Barbers Point was closed by Base Realignment and Closure (BRAC) action in the late 1990s, with the Navy aircraft, primarily P-3C Orion maritime patrol aircraft assigned to squadrons of Patrol Wing Two and SH-60B Seahawk helicopters assigned to Helicopter Antisubmarine Squadron Light 37 (HSL-37), relocating to Marine Corps Air Station Kaneohe Bay, now Marine Corps Base Hawaii, on the other side of the island.

CGAS Barbers Point, with its HC-130H Hercules and HH-65 Dolphin helicopters, was a former tenant command at NAS Barbers Point and continues to operate as the remaining military aviation presence at the airfield.

Gallery

See also
 HABS/HAER documentation of Naval Air Station Barbers Point for a listing of the very extensive documentation of Naval Air Station Barbers Point by the Historic American Buildings Survey.
 Solar Impulse 2 landed in Kalaeloa Airport on 3 July 2015, after achieving the longest non-stop solo fixed-wing airplane flight in history.

References

External links
 Hawaii DOT page for Kalaeloa Airport

Airports in Hawaii
Transportation in Honolulu County, Hawaii
Buildings and structures in Honolulu County, Hawaii
Historic American Buildings Survey in Hawaii
Airports established in 1999
1999 establishments in Hawaii